Phyllonorycter scabiosella is a moth of the family Gracillariidae. It is found from Great Britain through Germany, Poland and Ukraine to southern Russia and from the Netherlands to Spain and Italy.

The larvae feed on small scabious (Scabiosa columbaria). They mine the leaves of their host plant and are often found on seedlings. They create a large, lower-surface tentiform mine, causing a strong contraction of the leaf. The surroundings of the mine often turn violet. Pupation takes place in a cocoon. The frass is deposited in a corner of the mine.

References

External links
 

scabiosella
Moths described in 1853
Moths of Europe
Taxa named by John William Douglas